In meteorology, clear-air turbulence (CAT) is the turbulent movement of air masses in the absence of any visual clues, such as clouds, and is caused when bodies of air moving at widely different speeds meet.

Here CAT is most frequently encountered in the regions of jet streams. At lower altitudes it may also occur near mountain ranges. Thin cirrus clouds can also indicate high probability of CAT.

CAT can be hazardous to the comfort, and occasionally the safety, of air travelers.

CAT in the jet stream is expected to become stronger and more frequent because of climate change, with transatlantic wintertime CAT increasing by 59% (light), 94% (moderate), and 149% (severe) by the time of  doubling.

Definition
In meteorology, clear-air turbulence (CAT) is the turbulent movement of air masses in the absence of any visual clues, such as clouds, and is caused when bodies of air moving at widely different speeds meet.

In aviation, CAT is defined as "the detection by aircraft of high-altitude inflight bumps in patchy regions devoid of significant cloudiness or nearby thunderstorm activity". It was first noted in the 1940s.

Detection 
Clear-air turbulence is usually impossible to detect with the naked eye and very difficult to detect with a conventional radar, with the result that it is difficult for aircraft pilots to detect and avoid it. However, it can be remotely detected with instruments that can measure turbulence with optical techniques, such as scintillometers, Doppler LIDARs, or N-slit interferometers.

Factors 
At typical heights where it occurs, the intensity and location cannot be determined precisely. However, because this turbulence affects long range aircraft that fly near the tropopause, CAT has been intensely studied. Several factors affect the likelihood of CAT. Often more than one factor is present. 

Jet stream produces horizontal wind shear at its edges, caused by the different relative air speeds of the stream and the surrounding air. Wind shear, a difference in relative speed between two adjacent air masses, can produce vortices, and when of sufficient degree, the air will tend to move chaotically.

A strong anticyclone vortex can also lead to CAT.

Background information 

A jet stream alone will rarely be the cause of CAT, although there is 

Rossby waves caused by this jet stream shear and the Coriolis force cause it to meander.

Although the altitudes near the tropopause are usually cloudless, thin cirrus cloud can form where there are abrupt changes of air velocity, for example associated with jet streams. Lines of cirrus perpendicular to the jet stream indicate possible CAT, especially if the ends of the cirrus are dispersed, in which case the direction of dispersal can indicate if the CAT is stronger at the left or at the right of the jet stream.

A temperature gradient is the change of temperature over a distance in some given direction. Where the temperature of a gas changes, so does its density and where the density changes CAT can appear.

From the ground upwards through the troposphere temperature decreases with height; from the tropopause upwards through the stratosphere temperature increases with height. Such variations are examples of temperature gradients.

A horizontal temperature gradient may occur, and hence air density variations, where air velocity changes. An example: the speed of the jet stream is not constant along its length; additionally air temperature and hence density will vary between the air within the jet stream and the air outside.

As is explained elsewhere in this article, temperature decreases and wind velocity increase with height in the troposphere, and the reverse is true within the stratosphere. These differences cause changes in air density, and hence viscosity. The viscosity of the air thus presents both inertias and accelerations which cannot be determined in advance.

Vertical wind shear above the jet stream (i.e., in the stratosphere) is sharper when it is moving upwards, because wind speed decreases with height in the stratosphere. This is the reason CAT can be generated above the tropopause, despite the stratosphere otherwise being a region which is vertically stable. On the other hand, vertical wind shear moving downwards within the stratosphere is more moderate (i.e., because downwards wind shear within the stratosphere is effectively moving against the manner in which wind speed changes within the stratosphere) and CAT is never produced in the stratosphere. Similar considerations apply to the troposphere but in reverse.

When strong wind deviates, the change of wind direction implies a change in the wind speed. A stream of wind can change its direction by differences of pressure. CAT appears more frequently when the wind is surrounding a low pressure region, especially with sharp troughs that change the wind direction more than 100°. Extreme CAT has been reported without any other factor than this.

Mountain waves are formed when four requirements are met. When these factors coincide with jet streams, CAT can occur:
 A mountain range, not an isolated mountain
 Strong perpendicular wind
 Wind direction maintained with altitude
 Temperature inversion at the top of the mountain range

The tropopause is a layer which separates two very different types of air. Beneath it, the air gets colder and the wind gets faster with height. Above it, the air warms and wind velocity decreases with height. These changes in temperature and velocity can produce fluctuation in the altitude of the tropopause, called gravity waves.

Effects on aircraft 
In the context of air flight, CAT is sometimes colloquially referred to as "air pockets".

Standard airplane radars cannot detect CAT, as CAT is not associated with clouds that show unpredictable movement of the air. Airlines and pilots should be aware of factors that cause or indicate CAT to reduce the probability of meeting turbulence.

Aircraft in level flight rely on a constant air density to retain stability. Where air density is significantly different, for instance because of temperature gradient, especially at the tropopause, CAT can occur.

Where an aircraft changes its position horizontally from within the jet stream to outside the jet stream, or vice versa, a horizontal temperature gradient may be experienced. Because jet streams meander, such a change of position need not be the result of a change of course by the aircraft.

Because the altitude of the tropopause is not constant, an airplane that flies at a constant altitude would traverse it and encounter any associated CAT.

Pilot rules 
When a pilot experiences CAT, a number of rules should be applied: 
 The aircraft must sustain the recommended velocity for turbulence.
 When following the jet stream to escape from the CAT, the aircraft must change altitude and/or heading.
 When the CAT arrives from one side of the airplane, the pilot must observe the thermometer to determine whether the aircraft is above or below the jet stream and then move away from the tropopause.
 When the CAT is associated with a sharp trough, the plane must go through the low-pressure region instead of around it.
 The pilot may issue a Pilot Report (PIREP), communicating position, altitude and severity of the turbulence to warn other aircraft entering the region.

Cases 
Because aircraft move so quickly, they can experience sudden unexpected accelerations or 'bumps' from turbulence, including CAT – as the aircraft rapidly cross invisible bodies of air which are moving vertically at many different speeds. Although the vast majority of cases of turbulence are harmless, in rare cases cabin crew and passengers on aircraft have been injured when tossed around inside an aircraft cabin during extreme turbulence. In a small number of cases, people have been killed.

On March 5, 1966, BOAC Flight 911 from Tokyo to Hong Kong, a Boeing 707, broke up in CAT, with the loss of all persons (124) on board after experiencing severe lee-wave turbulence just downwind of Mount Fuji, Japan. The sequence of failure started with the vertical stabilizer getting ripped off.
On December 28, 1997 on United Airlines Flight 826 one person died. 
On May 1, 2017, Boeing 777 flight SU270 from Moscow to Thailand flew into clear air turbulence. The aircraft suddenly lost altitude and 27 passengers who were not buckled up sustained serious injuries. The pilots were able to stabilize the plane and continue the flight. All passengers who needed medical attention were taken to Bangkok hospital upon arrival.

See also 
 Continuous gusts
 Dryden Wind Turbulence Model
 Ellrod index
 N-slit interferometer
 von Kármán Wind Turbulence Model
Wake turbulence

References

External links 
 Brace for Turbulence
 Clear Air Turbulence Forecast (USA)
 
 

Aerodynamics
Weather hazards to aircraft
Meteorological phenomena
Turbulence
Wind